Penyberth was a farmhouse at Penrhos, on the Llŷn Peninsula near Pwllheli, Gwynedd, which had been the home to generations of patrons of poets,  and also a way-station for pilgrims to Bardsey Island,  but destroyed in 1936 in order to build a training camp and aerodrome for the RAF.

History

Background 

Welsh nationalism was ignited in 1936 when the UK government settled on establishing the RAF Penrhos bombing school at Penyberth on the Llŷn peninsula in Gwynedd. The events surrounding the protest, known as Tân yn Llŷn (Fire in Llŷn), helped define Plaid Genedlaethol Cymru (National Party of Wales). The UK government settled on Llŷn as the site for its new bombing school after similar locations in Northumberland and Dorset were met with protests.

However,  UK Prime Minister Stanley Baldwin refused to hear the case against the bombing school in Wales, despite a deputation representing half a million Welsh protesters. Protest against the bombing school was summed up by Saunders Lewis when he wrote that the UK government was intent upon turning one of the 'essential homes of Welsh culture, idiom, and literature' into a place for promoting a barbaric method of warfare. Construction of the bombing school building began exactly 400 years after the first part of the Laws in Wales Acts 1535–1542 which brought Wales into the same legal jurisdiction and administrative state as the rest of the Kingdom of England.

Fire and sentencing 

On 8 September 1936,  three Plaid Cymru members, dramatist and lecturer Saunders Lewis, poet and preacher Lewis Valentine and novelist DJ Williams, set fire to the bombing school and then went to give themselves up at Pwllheli police station, in accordance with Gandhian principles.  Legend has it that they then spent the evening discussing poetry with the duty sergeant. The trial at Caernarfon failed to agree on a verdict and the case was sent to the Old Bailey in London. The "Three" were sentenced to nine months imprisonment in Wormwood Scrubs, and on their release they were greeted as heroes by fifteen thousand Welsh at a pavilion in Caernarfon.

Public response 
Many Welsh people were angered by the judge's scornful treatment of the Welsh language, by the decision to move the trial to London, and by the decision of University College, Swansea, to dismiss Lewis from his post before he had been found guilty. Dafydd Glyn Jones wrote of the fire that it was "the first time in five centuries that Wales struck back at England with a measure of violence... To the Welsh people, who had long ceased to believe that they had it in them, it was a profound shock."

Symbolism 

Current use 
Penyberth was the site of the Wakestock contemporary music festival from 2000 to 2014.

See also
 RAF Penrhos

References

Jenkins, Dafydd (1998), A nation on trial: Penyberth, 1936. Translated by Ann Corkett. Cardiff: Welsh Academic Press. .

External links 
BBC Cymru ar yr Awyr - sound clips of Saunders Lewis and DJ Williams speaking about the incident (in Welsh)
Sabhal Mòr Ostaig - picture of the three
National Library of Wales, "Gathering the Jewels" - admission ticket to the trial of Saunders Lewis, Lewis Valentine and D. J. Williams, at Caernarfon

Arson in the United Kingdom
Buildings and structures in Gwynedd
Politics of Wales
Llanbedrog